Matt Bowen is an American musician from Omaha, Nebraska.  He attended Westside High School in Omaha, Nebraska.  Bowen played in The Faint, Commander Venus, Magic Kiss (with future members of Tilly and the Wall), Race For Titles, The Third Men, and briefly in the live version of Fizzle Like A Flood.  He currently drums in Little Brazil.

References 

Living people
American drummers
American indie rock musicians
Place of birth missing (living people)
Year of birth missing (living people)
Musicians from Omaha, Nebraska
Commander Venus members
The Faint members